San Francesco is a Gothic-style, Roman Catholic church and convent located near the center of Mondavio, region of Marche, Italy. The convent is now part of an elementary school at Piazza Matteotti.

History

While the exterior is simple unfinished brick; the interior was refurbished in Baroque fashion. The flanks of the church have buttresses. The bell-tower arises from the convent. The church dates from 1292, putatively at a site where St Francis of Assisi preached. The convent was suppressed in the 19th century and was used for various purposes. The interior has houses the relics of the Martyr Lucius, and has a medieval wooden crucifix and paintings, including an Immaculate Conception, (1535) by Giuliano Presutti.

References

Roman Catholic churches in Mondavio
Gothic architecture in le Marche
13th-century Roman Catholic church buildings in Italy
Churches completed in 1292
Francesco Mondavio